Shyamoli Cinema is a movie theater located in Shyamoli, Mirpur Thana of Dhaka, the capital of Bangladesh. Originally the area was named "Shyamoli" after this theatre.

History

M.A. Gaffar opened Shyamoli Cinema Hall on 26 March 1976. The first film shown in this 1300-seat movie theater was Jaal Theke Jaala. In 2007, the building in where Shyamoli Cinema Hall situated was demolished for the construction of a new shopping mall in that place. As a result, Shyamoli cinema was closed on August 31 of that year. Later, on April 14, 2014, Shyamoli Cinema Hall was reopened in a part of Shyamoli Square complex by the initiative of five sons of M.A. Gaffar. Modern facilities were added to the movie theater and the number of seats was reduced to 306.

References

External links
 

Cinemas in Dhaka
1976 establishments in Bangladesh